Ted Kapita (born July 22, 1996) is a Congolese professional basketball player. Standing at 6 ft 8 in (2.03 m), he played as forward. Kapita played for the NC State Wolfpack during the 2016–17 season.

High school career 
A native of the Democratic Republic of the Congo, Kapita came to the United States to play high school basketball. He attended Huntington Prep in West Virginia and the DME Academy in Florida, before enrolling at the North Carolina State University in 2016. He had originally signed with the University of Arkansas, but did not receive academic clearance.

College career 
At NC State, Kapita saw the court in 26 games, averaging 4.3 points and 3.4 rebounds per contest in 2016-17. After the conclusion of his freshman season, he opted to turn professional and enter the 2017 NBA draft. However, he was not selected by any NBA team.

Professional career 
In October 2017, Kapita made the training camp roster of the Erie BayHawks, NBA G League affiliate of the Atlanta Hawks, but was waived on October 25, 2017. Before the 2018–19 season, he joined the St. John's Edge of the National Basketball League of Canada for training camp. In 2019, he played nine league games for HKK Zrinjski HT Mostar of Bosnia and Herzegovina.

References

External links 
 NC State bio
 Profile at eurobasket.com

1996 births
Living people
Democratic Republic of the Congo men's basketball players
NC State Wolfpack men's basketball players
Basketball players from Kinshasa
Forwards (basketball)